The men's team competition of the squash event at the 2015 Southeast Asian Games will be held from 11 to 13 June at the Kallang Squash Centre, Kallang, Singapore.

Schedule

Results

Preliminary round

Pool A

Pool B

Knockout round

Semifinals

Gold medal match

References

External links

Men's team